The title Hero of the Soviet Union was the highest distinction of the Soviet Union. It was awarded 12,775 times. Due to the large size of the list, it has been broken up into multiple pages.

 Grigory Sabanov ru
 Anany Sabashnikov ru
 Fyodor Sabelnikov ru
 Mikhail Sabenin ru
 Fayzdrakhman Sabriov ru
 Hafiz Sabirov ru
 Vladimir Sablin ru
 Pyotr Sablin ru
 Aleksandr Saburov
 Georgy Saburov ru
 Vladimir Savva ru
 Arkady Savvateev ru
 Aleksandr Vasilyevich Savelev ru
 Aleksandr Fyodorovich Savelev ru
 Afanasy Spiridonovich Savelev ru
 Valentin Savelev ru
 Vasily Antonovich Savelev ru
 Vasily Lyvovich Savelev ru
 Yevgeny Savelev ru
 Ivan Savelev ru
 Konstantin Aleksandrovich Savelev ru
 Konstantin Ivanovich Savelev ru
 Mikhail Savelev ru
 Fyodor Savelev ru
 Akim Savenko ru
 Nikolai Savenko ru
 Viktor Savin ru
 Nikolai Savin ru
 Viktor Savinykh (twice)
 Nikolai Savinykh ru
 Svetlana Savitskaya (twice)
 Yevgeny Savitsky (twice)
 Konstantin Savostin ru
 Sergey Savostyanov ru
 Pyotr Savichkin ru
 Ivan Savoshchev ru
 Aleksandr Savushkin ru
 Stepan Savushkin ru
 Aleksandr Savchenko ru
 Vladimir Savchenko ru
 Ivan Savchenko ru
 Nikolai Savchenko ru
 Pavel Savchenko ru
 Aleksandr Savchenkov ru
 Grigory Savchuk ru
 Stepan Savchuk ru
 Pavel Sagaydachny ru
 Yuri Sagaydachny ru
 Pavel Sadakov ru
 Nikolai Sadovnikov ru
 Aleksandr Sadovoy ru
 Ivan Sadovsky ru
 Yuri Sadovsky ru
 Pavel Sadamskov ru
 Samat Sadriev ru
 Fyodor Sadchikov ru
 Botobay Sadykov ru
 Samat Sadykov ru
 Yusif Sadykhov
 Timofey Saevich ru
 Vasily Saenko ru
 Ivan Saenko ru
 Mikhail Saenko ru
 Pyotr Saenko ru
 Viktor Sazhinov ru
 Afanasy Sazonov ru
 Ivan Sazonov ru
 Mikhail Sazonov ru
 Nikolai Arkhipovich Sazonov ru
 Nikolai Petrovich Sazonov ru
 Rim Sazonov ru
 Amirali Saidbekov ru
 Gabdulkhay Saitov ru
 Sadyk Sayranov ru
 Nikolai Sakov ru
 Anton Salamakha ru
 Gataulla Salikhov ru
 Midkhat Salikhov ru
 Esed Salikov ru
 Aleksandr Salov ru
 Mikhail Salov ru
 Vladimir Salomatin ru
 Mikhail Salomatin ru
 Ivan Salykov ru
 Aleksey Salnikov ru
 Mikhail Salnikov ru
 Mikhail Samarin ru
 Ivan Samarkin ru
 Nikolai Samarkov ru
 Ivan Sambuk ru
 Ivan Samburov ru
 Sergey Samkov ru
 Vasily Samovarov ru
 Ivan Samodeev ru
 Niktor Samodelkin ru
 Aleksandr Samoylov ru
 Dmitry Samoylov
 Ivan Arsenevich Samoylov ru
 Ivan Mikhailovich Samoylov ru
 Grigory Samoylovich ru
 Nikolai Samorodov ru
 Sergey Samorodov ru
 Aleksandr Samofalov ru
 Aleksandr Samokhvalov ru
 Iosif Samokhvalov ru
 Mikhail Samokhvalov ru
 Nikolai Samokhvalov ru
 Fyodor Samokhvalov ru
 Anatoly Samokhin ru
 Ivan Samokhin ru
 Mikhail Samokhin ru
 Nikolai Samokhin ru
 Pavel Samokhin ru
 Pyotr Filatovich Samokhin ru
 Pyotr Yakovlevich Samokhin ru
 Anatoly Samochkin ru
 Boris Samsonov ru
 Vladimir Andreevich Samsonov ru
 Vladimir Sergeevich Samsonov ru
 Ivan Samsonov ru
 Konstantin Samsonov ru
 Pavel Samsonov ru
 Stanislav Samsonov ru
 Zinaida Samsonova 
 Vilis Samsons ru
 Andrey Samusev ru
 Nikolai Samusev ru
 Grigory Samkharadze ru
 Mikhail Sanachyov ru
 Vladimir Sandalov ru
 Nikolai Sandzhirov ru
 Yevgeny Saneev ru
 Mikhail Sannikov ru
 Stepan Sannikov ru
 Fyodor Sannikov ru
 Olga Sanfirova
 Fyodor Sanchirov ru
 Ivan Sanko ru
 Ivan Sankov ru
 Ivan Sapalyov ru
 Fyodor Sapatinsky ru
 Ivan Sapelkin ru
 Abram Sapozhnikov ru
 Aleksey Sapozhnikov ru
 Vladimir Sapozhnikov ru
 Mikhail Aleksandrovich Sapozhnikov ru
 Mikhail Grigorievich Sapozhnikov ru
 Ivan Saponenko ru
 Vladimir Saprykin
 Boris Sapunkov ru
 Aleksey Sapunov ru
 Nikolai Sapunov ru
 Nikolai Sapaev ru
 Ivan Sarana ru
 Mikhail Sarancha ru
 Nikolai Saranchyov ru
 Gennady Sarafanov
 Ishkhan Saribekyan ru
 Armais Sarkisov ru
 Fyodor Sarkisov ru
 Vasily Sarkisyan ru
 Suren Sarkisyan ru
 Sergey Sarkhoshev ru
 Aleksandr Sarygin ru
 Fyodor Sarychev ru
 Aram Safarov ru
 Faris Safarov
 Nakip Safin ru
 Nurulla Safin ru
 Gany Safiullin ru
 Anatoly Safonov ru
 Boris Safonov (twice)
 Vladimir Safonov ru
 Georgy Safonov ru
 Ilya Safonov ru
 Fyodor Safonov ru
 Andrey Safronov ru
 Pyotr Safronov ru
 Sergey Safronov 
 Timofey Safronov ru
 Fyodor Safronov ru
 Valentina Safronova
 Pavel Sakharov ru
 Mikhail Sakhnenko ru
 Iosif Sachko ru
 Mikhail Sachkov ru
 Yemelyan Sayapin ru
 Andrey Sbitnev ru
 Ilya Svezhentsev ru
 Grigory Sverdlikov ru
 Abram Sverdlov ru
 Aleksey Svertilov ru
 Georgy Svetachev ru
 Grigory Grigorievich Svetetsky ru
 Grigory Lavrentevich Svetetsky ru
 Timofey Svetlichny ru
 Aleksandr Svechkaryov ru
 Ivan Svechkaryov ru
 Pavel Svechnikov ru
 Aleksandr Svidersky ru
 Savely Svidersky ru
 Vladimir Svidersky ru
 Iosif Svidersky ru
 Nikolai Svinarchuk ru
 Afanasy Svinar ru
 Pavel Svirepkin ru
 Aleksandr Sviridov ru
 Aleksey Sviridov ru
 Karp Sviridov
 Nikolai Sviridov ru
 Anatoly Sviridovsky ru
 Vladimir Svirchevsky ru
 Pavel Svistov ru
 Anatoly Svistunov ru
 Andrey Svistunov ru
 Nikolai Svitenko ru
 Ludvík Svoboda
 Leonid Svyatoshenko ru
 Yuri Svyashchenko ru
 Grigory Sgibnev ru
 Pyotr Sgibnev ru
 Aleksandr Shabalin (twice)
 Boris Shabalin ru
 Vladimir Shabalin ru
 Boris Shaban ru
 Kazimir Shaban ru
 Vasily Shabanov ru
 Ivan Shabanov ru
 Fyodor Shabashov ru
 Viktor Shabelnik ru
 Ivan Shabelnikov ru
 Ivan Shabunin ru
 Valentin Shaburov ru
 Yegor Shavkunov ru
 Pyotr Shavurin ru
 Fairt Shagaleyev ru
 Anatoly Shagalov ru
 Galimzyan Shagvaleyev ru
 Abdulla Shagiev ru
 Gennady Shadrin ru
 Ivan Shadrin ru
 Shadi Shaimov ru
 Pavel Shaykin ru
 Zaky Shaymardanov ru
 Gimay Shaykhutdinov ru
 Kenzhibek Shakenov ru
 Astanakul Shakirov ru
 Sadu Shakirov ru
 Ulmas Shakirov ru
 Pyotr Shakurin ru
 Yakov Shakurov ru
 Fyodor Shakushev ru
 Valdemar Shalandin ru
 Nikolai Shalashkov ru
 Mikhail Shalzhiyan ru
 Aleksey Shalimov ru
 Vasily Shalimov ru
 Vladimir Yegorovich Shalimov
 Vladimir Fyodorovich Shalimov ru
 Nikolai Shalimov ru
 Sergey Shalygin ru
 Pavel Ivanovich Shamaev ru
 Pavel Stepanovich Shamaev ru
 Ivan Shamanov ru
 Anatoly Shamansky ru
 Pavel Shamardin ru
 Fattakh Shamgulov ru
 Ivan Shamenkov ru
 Akram Shamkaev ru
 Mikhail Shamray ru
 Gali Shamsutdinov ru
 Daniil Shamura ru
 Nikolai Shamshik ru
 Anatoly Shamshur ru
 Aleksandr Shamshurin ru
 Vasily Shamshurin ru
 Prokopy Shanaurin ru
 Idel Shandalov ru
 Vladimir Shandula ru
 Grigory Shapar ru
 Valentin Shapiro ru
 Nikolai Vasilyevich Shapkin ru
 Nikolai Pavlovich Shapkin ru
 Vasily Shapoval ru
 Grigory Shapoval ru
 Semyon Shapovalenko ru
 Aleksandr Shapovalov ru
 Afanasy Shapovalov ru
 Yevgeny Shapovalov
 Ivan Shapovalov ru
 Nikolai Shapovalov ru
 Ivan Shapochka ru
 Mikhail Shapochkin ru
 Aleksandr Shaposhnikov ru
 Vladimir Shaposhnikov ru
 Matvey Shaposhnikov
 Yakov Shaposhnikov ru
 Ivan Shapshaev ru
 Nikolai Sharabarin ru
 Vladimir Sharapa ru
 Igor Shardakov ru
 Vasily Denisovich Sharenko ru
 Vasily Sharpenko ru
 Aleksandr Sharikov ru
 Nikolai Sharikov ru
 Irgash Sharipov ru
 Ismat Sharipov ru
 Nurmy Sharipov ru
 Fatyh Sharipov
 Nikolai Sharko ru
 Aleksey Sharkov ru
 Valentin Sharkov ru
 Rakesh Sharma
 Aleksandr Sharpov ru
 Aleksey Sharpov ru
 Vasily Sharpov ru
 Dmitry Sharpov ru
 Ivan Sharpov ru
 Markel Sharpov ru
 Nikolai Sharpov ru
 Pavel Sharpov ru
 Boris Sharonov ru
 Mikhail Sharonov ru
 Fyodor Sharonov ru
 Mikhail Sharokhin
 Pyotr Sharpilo ru
 Nikolai Sharuev ru
 Abram Shrypov ru
 Nikolai Sharypov ru
 Nikolai Shataev ru
 Sleksey Shatalin ru
 Ivan Shatalin ru
 Aleksandr Shatalkin ru
 Vladimir Shatalov (twice)
 Kim Shatilo ru
 Mikhail Shatilo ru
 Vasily Shatilov
 Gennady Shatin ru
 Mikhail Shatov ru
 Afanasy Shatokhin ru
 Ivan Shatokhin ru
 Viktor Shatrov ru
 Nikolai Shatrov ru
 Fyodor Shatrov ru
 Ivan Shaumyan ru
 Pyotr Shafranov
 Aleksandr Shafrov ru
 Andrey Shakhvorostov ru
 Sergey Shakhvorostov ru
 Semyon Shakhmatov ru
 Moisey Shakhnovich ru
 Andrey Shakhov ru
 Mikhail Shakhovtsev ru
 Ernst Shakht
 Vasily Shatskikh ru
 Nikolai Shashkin ru
 Viktor Shashkov ru
 German Shashkov ru
 Timofey Shashlo ru
 Yakov Shashlov ru
 Moisey Shvartsman ru
 Yakov Shvachko ru
 Vasily Shvets ru
 Ivan Shvets ru
 Stepan Shvets ru
 Ulyan Shvets ru
 Ivan Shvetsov ru
 Stepan Shvetsov ru
 Pavel Shvydkoy ru
 Andrey Shebalkov
 Fyodor Shebanov
 Anton Shevelyov ru
 Viktor Shevelyov ru
 Mark Shevelyov
 Nikolai Artamonovich Shevelyov ru
 Nikolai Semyonovich Shevelyov ru
 Pavel Shevelyov ru
 Pyotr Shevelyov ru
 Sergey Shevelyov ru
 Demid Shevenok ru
 Nikolai Sheverdyaev ru
 Anatoly Shevkunov ru
 Nikolai Shevlyakov ru
 Aleksandr Shevtsov ru
 Vasily Shevtsov ru
 Georgy Shevtsov ru
 Ivan Shevtsov ru
 Pyotr Shevtsov ru
 Lyubov Shevtsova
 Aleksandr Yevseyevich Shevchenko ru
 Aleksandr Iosifovich Shevchenko ru
 Andrey Shevchenko ru
 Boris Shevchenko ru
 Vladimir Shevchenko ru
 Grigory Ivanovich Shevchenko ru
 Grigory Markovich Shevchenko ru
 Grigory Mefodievich Shevchenko ru
 Ivan Grigorievich Shevchenko ru
 Ivan Markovich Shevchenko ru
 Mefody Shevchenko ru
 Mikhail Nikitovich Shevchenko ru
 Mikhail Stepanovich Shevchenko ru
 Nikolai Shevchenko ru
 Pyotr Grigorievich Shevchenko ru
 Pyotr Lavrentevich Shevchenko ru
 Valentin Shevchuk ru
 Vasily Shevchuk ru
 Grigory Shevchuk ru
 Fyodor Shevchuk ru
 Aleksandr Shevyryov ru
 Valentin Shevyrin ru
 Ivan Shein ru
 Pavel Shein ru
 Ivan Sheykin ru
 Mikhail Sheykin ru
 Boris Sheiko ru
 Stasis Sheinauskas ru
 Anton Shelaev ru
 Aleksandr Shelepen ru
 Pyotr Shelepov
 Vasily Galaktionovich Shelest ru
 Vasily Mitrofanovich Shelest ru
 Dennis Shelest ru
 Nikolai Shelikhov ru
 Nikolai Shelkovnikov ru
 Sergey Shelkovy ru
 Nikolai Shelomtsev ru
 Nikolai Shelukhin ru
 Grigory Shelushkov ru
 Fyodor Shelshakov ru
 Pyotr Shemendyuk ru
 Afanasy Shemenkov ru
 Aleksey Shemigon ru
 Grigory Shemyakin ru
 Georgy Shemgeliya ru
 Ivan Shengur ru
 Nikolai Shendrikov ru
 Nikolai Shentsov ru
 Vasily Shenshakov ru
 Georgy Shepelev ru
 Nikolai Gavrilovich Shepelev ru
 Nikolai Shepelev ru
 Ivan Shepel ru
 Ivan Shepetkov ru
 Ivan Shepetov
 Pyotr Sheredegin ru
 Ivan Sheremet ru
 Leonid Sheronov ru
 Vladimir Sherstnyov ru
 Nikolai Sherstobitov ru
 Nikolai Sherstov ru
 Sergey Shershavin ru
 Aleksey Shestakov ru
 Arkhip Shestakov ru
 Konstantin Shestakov ru
 Lev Shestakov
 Maksim Shestakov ru
 Mikhail Shestakov ru
 Boris Shesternin ru
 Boris Shekhriev ru
 Aleksey Shibaev ru
 Mikhail Shibaev ru
 Vasily Shibankov ru
 Viktor Shibankov ru
 Grigory Shibanov ru
 Andrey Shigaev ru
 Grigory Shigaev ru
 Nikolai Shikin ru
 Yuri Shikov ru
 Ivan Shikunov ru
 Nikolai Shikunov ru
 Pavel Shikunov ru
 Nikolai Shilenkov ru
 Afanasy Shilin (twice)
 Mikhail Shilkin ru
 Anfilofy Shilkov ru
 Georgy Shilo ru
 Mikhail Shilo ru
 Aleksandr Shilov ru
 Grigory Shilov ru
 Mikhail Shilov ru
 Pyotr Shilov ru
 Semyon Shilov ru
 Sergey Shilov ru
 Leonid Shilovsky ru
 Pyotr Shildin ru
 Mikhail Shilnikov ru
 Ivan Shilnov ru
 Fyodor Shilyaev ru
 Grigory Shimko ru
 Daniil Shingiry ru
 Aron Sinder ru
 Nikolai Shindikov ru
 Fyodor Shinkarenko ru
 Panteley Shin ru
 Vasily Shipilov ru
 Yakov Shipilov ru
 Vasily Shipitsyn ru
 Mikhail Siritsyn ru
 Aleksandr Shipov ru
 Andrefy Shipulin ru
 Mikhail Shirikov ru
 Valentin Shirokikh ru
 Pyotr Shirokov ru
 Pyotr Shironin ru
 Pyotr Shirshov
 Vsevolod Shiryaev ru
 Pavel Shiryaev ru
 Pyotr Shisterov ru
 Ivan Shitikov ru
 Vasily Shitov ru
 Pavel Shitov ru
 Aleksandr Shikharev ru
 Aleksandr Sikhov ru
 Pavel Shikov ru
 Vasily Shishigin ru
 Abibo Shishinashvili ru
 Ilua Shishkan ru
 Aleksandr Ivanovich Shishkin ru
 Aleksandr Pavlovich Shishkin ru
 Valery Shishkin ru
 Vasily Ivanovich Shishkin ru
 Vasily Mikhailovich Shishkin ru
 Ivan Shishkin ru
 Mikhail Shishkin ru
 Nikolai Shishkin ru
 Pavel Shishkin ru
 Yakov Shishkin ru
 Viktor Shishkov ru
 Daniil Shishkov ru
 Mikhail Shishkov ru
 Viktor Shishlyannikov ru
 Ilya Shishmakov ru
 Vladimir Shishov ru
 Leonid Shishov ru
 Ivan Shishunov ru
 Georgy Shiyanov ru
 Ivan Shiyanov ru
 Ivan Shkadov ru
 Vladimir Shkapenko ru
 Mariya Shkarletova
 Konstantin Shkaruba ru
 Ivan Shkatov ru
 Grigory Shkenyov ru
 Vasily Shkil ru
 Fyodor Skiryov ru
 Pyotr Shkodin ru
 Dmitry Shkonda ru
 Timofey Shkrylyov ru
 Aleksey Shkulepov ru
 Nikolai Shkulipa ru
 Mikhail Shkunov ru
 Mikhail Shkurakov ru
 Dmitry Shkurat ru
 Yevgeny Shkurdalov ru
 Vasily Shkurin ru
 Makar Shkurko ru
 Roman Shkurko ru
 Ivan Shlyomin
 Nikolai Shlemov ru
 Viktor Shlepov ru
 Pyotr Shlyuykov ru
 Nikolai Shlyaev ru
 Ivan Shlyakov ru
 Gennady Shlyapin ru
 Aleksey Shlyakhtich ru
 Pyotr Shlyakhturov ru
 Anatoly Shmakov ru
 Vasily Shmakov ru
 Grigory Shmarovoz ru
 Maksim Shmatov
 Pyotr Shmatukha ru
 Boris Shmelyov ru
 Ilya Shmelyov
 Nikolai Shmelyov ru
 Nikolai Shmelkov ru
 Fritz Shmenkel
 Pyotr Shimgol ru
 Otto Shmidt
 Smitry Shmonin ru
 Nikolai Shmorgun ru
 Boris Shmotov ru
 Ivan Shmyg ru
 Arkady Shmygun ru
 Minay Shmyryov
 Fyodor Shmyrin ru
 Mikhail Shneyderman ru
 Aleksandr Shokurov ru
 Dmitry Sholokhov ru
 Nikifor Sholudenko ru
 Aleksandr Shomin ru
 Georgy Shonin
 Aleksandr Shopin ru
 Boris Shopin ru
 Duyshenkul Shopokov ru
 Aleksandr Shornikov ru
 Vasily Shornikov ru
 Nikolai Shornikov ru
 Grigory Shostatsky ru
 Nikolai Shokhin ru
 Vladimir Shoshin ru
 Vasily Shpagin ru
 Kuzma Shpak ru
 Pyotr Shpak ru
 Sergey Shpakovsky ru
 Pavel Shpetny ru
 Ivan Shpigunov ru
 Pavel Shpilko ru
 Grigory Shpilkov ru
 Sergey Shpunyakov ru
 Yakov Shtanev ru
 Stepan Shtanko ru
 Filipp Shtanko ru
 Dmitry Shtelmakh ru
 Aleksandr Shtepenko ru
 Grigory Shtern
 Grigory Shtonda ru
 Viktor Shtrigol ru
 Matevy Shtryakin ru
 Aleksey Shubin ru
 Andrey Shubin ru
 Vasily Shubin ru
 Aleksandr Shubinkov ru
 Aleksandr Shuvaev ru
 Konstantin Shuvalov ru
 Nikolai Shuvalov ru
 Sergey Shuvalov ru
 Vasily Shugayev
 Ilya Shuklin ru
 Akhmedzhan ru
 Shirin Shukurov
 Konstantin Shulaev ru
 Gennady Shulepov ru
 Vasily Shulga ru
 Semyon Shulga ru
 Aleksandr Shulgin ru
 Boris Shulgin ru
 Leonid Shulzhenko ru
 Nikolai Shulzhenko ru
 Mikhail Shults ru
 Vasily Shulyatikov ru
 Aleksey Shumavtsov ru
 Georgy Shumakov ru
 Zakhar Shumakov ru
 Yakov Shumakov ru
 Avksenty Shumeyko ru
 Grigory Shumeyko ru
 Nikolai Shumeyko ru
 Pyotr Shumeyko ru
 Aleksandr Shumelyov ru
 Ivan Shumilikhin ru
 Anatoly Shumilov ru
 Ivan Shumilov ru
 Mikhail Shumilov
 Vasily Shumikhin ru
 Grigory Shumkov ru
 Pyotr Shumov ru
 Aleksey Shumsky ru
 Konstantin Shumsky ru
 Fyodor Shuneyev ru
 Grigory Shupik ru
 Kalmanis Shuras ru
 Shota Shurgaya ru
 Dmitry Shurpenko ru
 Afanasy Shurupov ru
 Pavel Shurukhin (twice)
 Mikhail Shustov ru
 Terenty Shutilov ru
 Aleksey Shutov ru
 Viktor Shutov ru
 Pyotr Vasilyevich Shutov ru
 Pyotr Ivanovich Shutov ru
 Semyon Shutov ru
 Stepan Shutov (twice)
 Nikolai Shutt ru
 Yegor Shutko ru
 Ivan Shushin ru
 Ivan Shchabelsky ru
 Vasily Shchadin ru
 Boris Shchapov ru
 Aleksandr Shcheblakov ru
 Afanasy Shcheglov ru
 Ivan Shcheglov ru
 Stepan Shcheglov ru
 Vladimir Shchegolyov ru
 Grigory Shchedrin
 Pyotr Shchedrov ru
 Grigory Shchekotov ru
 Sergey Shchelkanov ru
 Vasily Shchelkunov ru
 Nikolai Shchemelyov ru
 Mikhail Shchenikov ru
 Aleksey Shchepkin ru
 Aleksandr Vasilyevich Shcherbak ru
 Aleksandr Mikhailovich Shcherbak ru
 Anatoly Shcherbak ru
 Aleksandr Aleksandrovich Shcherbakov ru
 Aleksandr Pavlovich Shcherbakov ru
 Aleksandr Fyodorovich Shcherbakov ru
 Aleksey Shcherbakov ru
 Arsenty Shcherbakov ru
 Vasily Vasilyevich Shcherbakov ru
 Vasily Kirillovich Shcherbakov ru
 Vasily Samuilovich Shcherbakov ru
 Viktor Shcherbakov ru
 Ivan Shcherbakov ru
 Nikolai Shcherbakov ru
 Oleg Shcherbakov ru
 Pavel Shcherbakov ru
 Pyotr Shcherbakov ru
 Sergey Shcherbakov ru
 Yakov Shcherbakov ru
 Timofey Shcherbanyov ru
 Afanasy Shcherban ru
 Mariya Shcherbachenko
 Dmitry Shcherbin ru
 Vasily Vasilyevich Shcherbina ru
 Vasily Illarionovich Shcherbina ru
 Ivan Shcherbina ru
 Nikolai Gavrilovich Shcherbina ru
 Nikolai Semyonovich Shcherbina ru
 Vladimir Shcherbinin ru
 Fedot Shcherbinin ru
 Pavel Shcherbinko ru
 Vasily Shchetinin ru
 Grigory Shchetinin ru
 Nikolai Shchetinin
 Dmitry Shchetsura ru
 Ivan Shchipakin ru
 Nikolai Shchipanov ru
 Ivan Shchipun ru
 Sergey Shchirov ru
 Andrey Shchukin ru
 Ivan Shchukin ru
 Lev Shchukin
 Nikolai Shchukin ru
 Feodosy Shchur ru
 Aleksandr Shchurikhin ru
 Nikolai Sdobnov ru
 Irina Sebrova
 Aleksey Sevastyanov ru
 Vitaly Sevastyanov (twice)
 Ivan Severin ru
 Moisevy Severin ru
 Timofey Severov ru
 Ivan Severyanov ru
 Ivan Sevostyanov ru
 Pavel Sevostyanov ru
 Sergey Sevostyanov ru
 Ivan Sevrikov ru
 Viktor Sevrin ru
 Aleksey Sevryukov ru
 Leonid Sevryukov ru
 Nikolai Sevryukov ru
 Pyotr Sedelnikov ru
 Timofey Sedenkov ru
 Sergey Sednev ru
 Nikolai Sednenkov ru
 Gennady Sedov ru
 Grigory Sedov ru
 Ivan Vasilyevich Sedov ru
 Ivan Viktorovich Sedov ru
 Konstantin Sedov ru
 Leonid Sedov ru
 Sergey Sedkevich ru
 Aleksandr Sedunov ru
 Ivan Sedykh ru
 Seyitnafe Seyitveliyev
 Vladimir Sekin ru
 Ivan Seledtsov ru
 Anatoly Seleznyov ru
 Mikhail Seleznyov ru
 Nikolai Illarionovich Seleznyov ru
 Nikolai Pavlovich Seleznyov ru
 Pyotr Seleznyov ru
 Fyodor Seleznyov ru
 Yevgraf Selivanov ru
 Ivan Selivanov ru
 Pyotr Selivanov ru
 Fyodor Selivantev ru
 Ivan Seliverstov ru
 Kuzma Yegorovich ru
 Fyodor Seliverstov ru
 Andrey Selifonov ru
 Ivan Selifonov ru
 Ivan Selitsky ru
 Nikolai Selitsky ru
 Vasily Selishchev ru
 Timofey Selishchev ru
 Mikhail Selgikov ru
 Semyon Selsky ru
 Arkady Selyutin ru
 Ivan Selyagin ru
 Yevgeny Selyanin ru
 Nikolai Semak ru
 Pavel Semak ru
 Afanasy Semakin ru
 Nikolai Semeyko (twice)
 Vladimir Semenishin ru
 Aleksandr Ivanovich Semyonov ru
 Aleksandr Fyodorovich Semyonov ru
 Aleksandr Yakovlevich Semyonov ru
 Andrey Daniilovich Semyonov ru
 Andrey Platonovich Semyonov ru
 Boris Semyonov ru
 Vladimir Kuzmich Semyonov ru
 Vladimir Fyodorovich Semyonov ru
 Dmitry Ivanovich Semyonov (sergeant) ru
 Dmitry Ivanovich Semyonov (major) ru
 Ivan Dmitrievich Semyonov ru
 Ivan Ilyich Semyonov ru
 Nikolai Semyonov ru
 Pavel Semyonov ru
 Pyotr Semyonov ru
 Stepan Semyonov ru
 Fyodor Semyonov ru
 Mikhail Sementsov ru
 Vasily Smenchenko ru
 Kuzma Cemenchenko ru
 Zakhar Semenyuk ru
 Ivan Semenyuk ru
 Pavel Semenyako ru
 Andrey Semernikov ru
 Fyodor Semiglazov ru
 Aleksandr Semikov ru
 Sergey Syomin ru
 Aleksandr Smiradsky ru
 Yakov Semchenko ru
 Ivan Senagin ru
 Vasily Senator ru
 Aleksandr Senatorov
 Grigory Senatosenko ru
 Musabek Sengirbaev ru
 Nikolai Sentyukov ru
 Vladimir Sentyurin ru
 Vladimir Senchenko ru
 Fyodor Senchenko ru
 Prokofy Senchikhin ru
 Vasily Senko (twice)
 Tit Senkov ru
 Viktor Senyushenkov ru
 Fyodor Serbin ru
 Nikolai Serbinenko ru
 Vladimir Serbulov ru
 Aleksandr Terentevich Sergeev ru
 Aleksandr Timofeevich Sergeev ru
 Aleksey Sergeev ru
 Anatoly Sergeev ru
 Vasily Dmitrievich Sergeev ru
 Vasily Pavlovich Sergeev ru
 Vladimir Sergeev ru
 Vsevold Sergeev ru
 Dmitry Sergeev ru
 Ivan Ivanovich Sergeev ru
 Ivan Nikolaevich Sergeev ru
 Ivan Fyodorovich Sergeev ru
 Leonid Sergeev ru
 Mikhail Sergeev ru
 Nikolai Sergeev ru
 Pyotr Yegorovich Sergeev ru
 Pyotr Petrovich Sergeev ru
 Sergey Sergeev ru
 Yuri Sergeev ru
 Nikolai Sergeenkov ru
 Vasily Sergienko ru
 Ivan Sergienko ru
 Nikolai Dmitrievich Sergienko ru
 Nikolai Yegorovich Sergienko ru
 Dmitry Sergienkov ru
 Aleksey Sergov ru
 Ivan Segrunin ru
 Semyon Serditov ru
 Grigory Serdyuk ru
 Iosif Serdyukov ru
 Nikolai Serdyukov ru
 Semyon Serdyukov ru
 Aleksandr Serebrov
 Andrey Serebryakov ru
 Nikolai Serebryakov ru
 Fyodor Serebryakov ru
 Aleksandr Serebryannikov ru
 Seryogin ru
 Vasily Seryogin ru
 Vladimir Seryogin
 Ivan Mikhailovich Sereda ru
 Ivan Pavlovich Sereda ru
 Igor Sereda ru
 Konstantin Sereda ru
 Pyotr Sereda ru
 Aleksandr Seredenko ru
 Vladimir Seredin ru
 Fyodor Seredin ru
 Yevgeny Seryodkin ru
 Aleksandr Seryozhnikov ru
 Ivan Serzhantov ru
 Vasily Serikov ru
 Ivan Konstantinovich Serikov ru
 Ivan Pavlovich Serikov ru
 Andrey Serkov ru
 Ivan Serkov ru
 Anatoly Serov
 Vladimir Serov
 Georgy Serov ru
 Ilya Serov ru
 Konstantin Serov ru
 Mikhail Serov ru
 Nikolai Serov ru
 Vasily Serogodsky ru
 Mikhail Serogodsky ru
 Iosif Serpep ru
 Grigory Serykh ru
 Semyon Serykh ru
 Pyotr Seryakov ru
 Aleksandr Sechkin ru
 Nikolai Sechkin ru
 Samand Siabandov
 Lutfulla Sibagatullin ru
 Semyon Sibirin ru
 Pyotr Sibirkin ru
 Aleksey Sibiryakov ru
 Ivan Sivakov
 Vasily Sivachenko ru
 Ivan Sivko ru
 Vadim Sivkov ru
 Grigory Sivkov (twice)
 Ivan Sivolap ru
 Pavel Sivolapenko ru
 Ivan Sivryuk ru
 Nikolai Sivtsov ru
 Nikolai Sigaev ru
 Dmitry Sigakov ru
 Vasily Sigov ru
 Dmitry Sigov ru
 Vasily Sidelnikov ru
 Parmeny Sidelnikov ru
 Boris Sidnev ru
 Aleksandr Sidorenko ru
 Boris Sidorenko ru
 Vasily Sidorenko ru
 Grigory Sidorenko ru
 Ivan Ilyich Sidorenko ru
 Ivan Mikhailovich Sidorenko
 Ivan Petrovich Sidorenko ru
 Mark Sidorenko ru
 Pyotr Sidorenko ru
 Rostislav Sidorenko ru
 Semyon Sidorenko ru
 Vasily Sidorenkov ru
 Aleksandr Sidorin ru
 VAsily Sidorin ru
 Aleksey Sidorishin ru
 Semyon Sidorkov ru
 Aleksandr Vasilyevich Sidorov ru
 Aleksandr Ivanovich Sidorov ru
 Vasily Sidorov ru
 Veniamin Sidorov ru
 Georgy Sidorov ru
 Dmitry Pavlovich Sidorov ru
 Dmitry Stepanovich Sidorov ru
 Ivan Dmitrievich Sidorov ru
 Ivan Zakharovich Sidorov ru
 Ivan Prokhorovich Sidorov ru
 Nikolai Grigorievich Sidorov ru
 Nikolai Ivanovich Sidorov ru
 Pavel Ivanovich Sidorov ru
 Pavel Nikitovich Sidorov ru
 Pyotr Sidorov ru
 Aleksandr Sidorovich ru
 Aleksey Sidyukov ru
 Vasily Sidyakin ru
 Ivan Sizintsev ru
 Boris Sizov ru
 Vasily Sizov ru
 Pyotr Sizov ru
 Nikolai Sikorsky ru
 Sergey Sikorsky ru
 Stepan Sikorsky ru
 Ivan Nikolaevich Silaev ru
 Ivan Sergeevich Silaev ru
 Aleksandr Silantev ru
 Ivan Silantev ru
 Mikhail Vasilyevich Silantev ru
 Mikhail Nikolaevich Silantev ru
 Nikolai Silantev ru
 Nikolai Silin ru
 Grigory Silkin ru
 Mikhail Silnitsky ru
 Ivan Simakov ru
 Timofey Simakov ru
 Fyodor Simakov ru
 Grigory Simankin ru
 Aleksandr Simanov ru
 Viktor Simanchuk ru
 Vasily Simbirtsev ru
 Nikolai Siminikhin ru
 Vasily Simon ru
 Aleksandr Simonenko ru
 Aleksey Simonenko ru
 Nikolai Dmitrievich Simonenko ru
 Nikolai Ivanovich Simonenko ru
 Nikolai Nikolaevich Simonenko ru
 Mikhail Simonov ru
 Vladimir Simonok ru
 Nikolai Simoniak
 Karapet Simonyan ru
 Semyon Singaevsky ru
 Nikolai Sindryakov ru
 Yakov Sinyov ru
 Viktor Sinelnikov ru
 Mikhail Sinelnikov ru
 Pyotr Sinelnikov ru
 Dmitry Sinenkov ru
 Valery Sinilnikov ru
 Viktor Sinitsky ru
 Aleksandr Nikolaevich Sinitsyn ru
 Aleksandr Pavlovich Sinitsyn ru
 Vasily Sinitsyn ru
 Daniil Sinitsyn ru
 Nikita Sinitsyn ru
 Fyodor Sinitsyn ru
 Fyodor Sinichkin ru
 Anatoly Sinnikov ru
 Vasily Sinchuk ru
 Pyotr Sinchukov ru
 Nikhail Sinko ru
 Anatoly Sinkov ru
 Sergey Sinkov ru
 Nikolai Sinyutin ru
 Fyodor Sinyavin ru
 Mikhail Sipovich ru
 Nikolai Sipyagin ru
 Pavel Siragov ru
 Ivan Sirenko ru
 Dmitry Sirik ru
 Nikolai Sirin ru
 Nikolsi Sirichenko ru
 Aleksey Sirotin ru
 Vitkor Sirotin ru
 Vyacheslav Sirotin ru
 Nikolai Sirotin ru
 Vasily Sirotinkin ru
 Anatoly Sirotkin ru
 Fyodor Sirotkin ru
 Yuri Sirotkin ru
 Sergey Sirotyuk ru
 Fyodor Siseykin ru
 Kasim Sitdikov ru
 Aleksandr Sitkovsky ru
 Grigory Sitnik ru
 Aleksey Sitnikov ru
 Vasily Yegorovich Sitnikov ru
 Vasily Petrovich Sitnikov ru
 Veniamin Sitnikov ru
 Nikolai Sitnikov ru
 Pyotr Sitnikov ru
 Valentin Sitnov ru
 Esmurat Sikhimov ru
 Pyotr Sikhno ru
 Mikhail Siyanin ru
 Pavel Skalatsky ru
 Vasily Skachkov ru
 Viktor Skachkov ru
 Konstantin Skachkov ru
 Nikolai Skachkov ru
 Aleksandr Vasilyevich Skvortsov ru
 Aleksandr Yegorovich Skvortsov ru
 Andrey Skvortsov ru
 Grigory Skvortsov ru
 Dmitry Skvortsov ru
 Ivan Skvortsov ru
 Kirill Skvortsov ru
 Nikolai Skvortsov ru
 Grigory Skiruta
 Boris Skityba ru
 Georgy Skleznyov ru
 Grigory Anikeevich Sklyar ru
 Grigory Mikhailovich Sklyar ru
 Anatoly Sklyarov ru
 Ivan Andreevich Sklyarov ru
 Ivan Grigorievich Sklyarov ru
 Maksim Sklyarov ru
 Aleksandr Sknaryov ru
 Vitt Skobarikhin ru
 Ivan Skobelev ru
 Aleksandr Skokov ru
 Ivan Skokov ru
 Pavel Skomorokha ru
 Nikolai Skomorokhov (twice)
 Vasily Skopenko ru
 Pavel Skopin ru
 Sergey Skornyakov ru
 Anatoly Skorobogatov ru
 Ivan Skory ru
 Vladimir Skorynin ru
 Fyodor Skoryatin ru
 Aleksandr Skochilov ru
 Mikhail Skripin ru
 Georgy Skripnikov ru
 Vujenty Skryganov ru
 Aleksey Skrylyov ru
 Viktor Skrylyov ru
 Pavel Skrynnikov ru
 Stepan Skrynnikov ru
 Vasily Skrynko ru
 Konstantin Skrytnikov ru
 Vasily Skryabin ru
 Viktor Skryabin ru
 Vladimir Skugar ru
 Ivan Skuridin ru
 Yakov Skusnichenko ru
 Georgy Arsentevich ru
 Pyotr Slabinyuk ru
 Georgy Slavgorodsky ru
 Ivan Slavyansky ru
 Vasily Slastin ru
 Aleksey Slastikhin ru
 Dmitry Slashchov ru
 Aleksey Slepanov ru
 Konstantin Slepanchuk ru
 Yakov Slepenkov ru
 Mavriky Slepnyov
 Anton Slivka ru
 Leonty Silzen ru
 Anton Slits ru
 Grigory Slovodenyuk ru
 Ivan Slovodenyuk ru
 Vasily Slobodzyan ru
 Aleksey Slobodchikov ru
 Mitrofan Slobodyan ru
 Mikhail Slovotskov ru
 Aleksandr Slovnov ru
 Yevstafy Slonsky ru
 Vitaly Slyunkin ru
 Mitrofan Slyusarev ru
 Sidor Slyusarev
 Zakhar Slyusarenko (twice)
 Albert Slyusar ru
 Leonty Smavzyuk ru
 Viktor Smaznov ru
 Aleksandr Smelov ru
 Vladimir Smetanin ru
 Grigory Smetanin ru
 Mikhail Smetanin ru
 Yakov Smetnyov ru
 Mikhail Simlsky ru
 Aleksandr Fyodorivich Smirnov ru
 Aleksandr Yakovlevich Smirnov ru
 Aleksey Yefimovich Smirnov ru
 Aleksey Panteleevich Smirnov ru
 Aleksey Semyonovich Smirnov (twice)
 Anatoly Vasilyevich Smirnov ru
 Arkady Smirnov ru
 Boris Aleksandrovich Smirnov (artilleryist) ru
 Boris Aleksandrovich Smirnov (pilot) ru
 Vasily Alekseevich Smirnov ru
 Vasily Ivanovich Smirnov ru
 Viktor Petrovich Smirnov ru
 Vitaly Smirnov ru
 Vladimir Antonovich Smirnov ru
 Vladimir Vasilyevich Smirnov ru
 Vladimir Yefimovich Smirnov ru
 Vyacheslav Smirnov ru
 Grigory Smirnov ru
 Dmitry Ivanovich Smirnov (general) ru
 Dmitry Ivanovich Smirnov (colonel) ru
 Dmitry Mikhailovich Smirnov ru
 Dmitry Nikolaevich Smirnov ru
 Ivan Mikhailovich Smirnov ru
 Ivan Fyodorovich Smirnov ru
 Klavdy Smirnov ru
 Konstantin Aleksandrovich Smirnov ru
 Konstantin Grigorievich Smirnov ru
 Mikhail Smirnov ru
 Nikolai Aleksandrovich Smirnov ru
 Nikolai Andreevich Smirnov (colonel) ru
 Nikolai Andreevich Smirnov (sergeant) ru
 Nikolai Ivanovich Smirnov
 Nikolai Fyodorovich Smirnov ru
 Nikolai Frolovich Smirnov ru
 Nikolai Yakovlevich Smirnov ru
 Oleg Smirnov ru
 Pavel Smirnov ru
 Sergey Grigorievich Smirnov ru
 Sergey Ivanovich Smirnov ru
 Fyodor Smirnov ru
 Yuri Smirnov ru
 Mariya Smirnova
 Leonid Smirnykh ru
 Roman Smishchuk ru
 Sergey Smolensky ru
 Aleksandr Smolin ru
 Abram Smolyakov ru
 Ivan Smolyakov ru
 Vasily Smolyanykh ru
 Feodosy Smolyachkov ru
 Aleksandr Smorchkov
 Nikita Smorchkov ru
 Yakov Smushkevich (twice)
 Afanasy Smyshlyaev ru
 Vasily Snagoshchenko ru
 Vladimir Snesaryov ru
 Ivan Snitko ru
 Amayak Snoplyan ru
 Vasily Sobina ru
 Ivan Sobko ru
 Mikhail Sobko ru
 Grigory Sobkovsky ru
 Afansy Sobolev ru
 Vitaly Sobolev ru
 Dmitry Sobolev ru
 Ivan Sobolev ru
 Konstantin Sobolev ru
 Mikhail Sobolev ru
 Nikolai Alekseevich Sobolev ru
 Nikolai Leontevich Sobolev ru
 Semyon Sobolev ru
 Aleksandr Sobolevsky ru
 Anatoly Sobolevsky ru
 Gavrill Sobyanin ru
 Ivan Sobyanin ru
 Mikhail Sovetsky ru
 Vladmir Sozinov ru
 Aleksandr Sozonov ru
 Ivan Sokol ru
 Rudolf Sokolinsky ru
 Aleksandr Sokolov ru
 Aleksey Sokolov ru
 Anatoly Ivanovich Sokolov ru
 Anatoly Mikhailovich Sokolov ru
 Afrikan Sokolov ru
 Boris Sokolov ru
 Valtentin Yevgenevich Sokolov ru
 Valentin Pterovich Sokolov ru
 Vasily Afanasevich Sokolov ru
 Vasily Pavlovich Sokolov
 Grigory Maksimovich Sokolov ru
 Grigory Semyonovich Sokolov ru
 Dmitry Sokolov ru
 Leonid Sokolov ru
 Mikhail Andrianovich Sokolov ru
 Mikhail Anisimovich Sokolov ru
 Mikhail Vasilyevich Sokolov ru
 Mikhail Yegorovich Sokolov ru
 Nikolai Vasilyevich Sokolov (lieutenant) ru
 Nikolai Vasilyevich Sokolov (general) ru
 Nikolai Mikhailovich Sokolov ru
 Nikolai Semyonovich Sokolov ru
 Semyon Sokolov ru
 Sergey Leonidovich Sokolov
 Sergey Nikolaevich Sokolov ru
 Yuri Sokolov ru
 Vasily Sokolovsky
 Aleksandr Sokolovsky ru
 Igor Sokolovsky ru
 Pyotr Sokur ru
 Vasily Soldatenko ru
 Ivan Soldatov ru
 Konstantin Soldatov ru
 Mikhail Solntsev ru
 Sergey Solntsev ru
 Vladimir Solovey ru
 Aleksey Solovyov ru
 Anatoly Fyodorovich Solovyov ru
 Anatoly Yakovlevich Solovyov
 Vasily Andreevich Solovyov ru
 Vasily Ivanovich Solovyov ru
 Vitaly Solovyov ru
 Vladimir Solovyov ru
 Vladimir Alekseevich Solovyov (twice)
 Gavriil Solovyov ru
 Yevgeny Solovyov ru
 Ivan Alekseevich Solovyov ru
 Ivan Vladimirovich Solovyov ru
 Konstantin Solovyov ru
 Mikhail Vasilyevich Solovyov ru
 Mikhail Georgievich Solovyov ru
 Mikhail Grigorievich Solovyov
 Mikhail Pavlovich Solovyov ru
 Nikolai Solovyov ru
 Pyotr Solovyov ru
 Trofim Solovyov ru
 Nikolai Sologub ru
 Makar Solodinov ru
 Nikolai Solodilov ru
 Leonid Solodkov
 Nikolai Solodkov ru
 Afanasy Solodov ru
 Yefim Solodov ru
 Artyom Solodyshev ru
 Aleksandr Solomatin ru
 Aleksey Solomatin
 Yefim Solomennikov ru
 Ivan Ivanovich Solomonenko ru
 Ivan Solomonikov ru
 Aleksandr Solomonov ru
 Vladimir Solonchenko ru
 Timofey Solopenko ru
 Ion Soltys ru
 Alekandr Soluyanov ru
 Vladimir Solyanik ru
 Anatoly Soyanikov ru
 Andrey Sommer ru
 Ivan Somov ru
 Mikhail Somov
 Pyotr Somov ru
 Ivan Sonin ru
 Filipp Sonnov ru
 Ilya Sopin ru
 Mikhail Soplyakov ru
 Bondzi Sordiyz ru
 Igor Sornev ru
 Aleksey Soroka ru
 Artyom Soroka ru
 Vasily Soroka ru
 Ivan Soroka ru
 Aleksey Sorokin ru
 Anatoly Sorokin ru
 Andrey Sorokin ru
 Boris Sorokin ru
 Vasily Andreevich Sorokin ru
 Vasily Petrovich Sorokin ru
 Vitaly Sorokin ru
 Georgy Sorokin ru
 Grigory Sorokin ru
 Zakhar Sorokin
 Ivan Alekseevich Sorokin ru
 Ivan Ivanovich Sorokin ru
 Ivan Petrovich Sorokin ru
 Ivan Fyodorovich Sorokin ru
 Mikhail Ivanovich Sorokin ru
 Mikhail Mikhailovich Sorokin ru
 Mikhail Yakovlevich Sorokin ru
 Pavel Vasilyevich Sorokin ru
 Sergey Dmitrievich Sorokin ru
 Sergey Maksimovich Sorokin ru
 Fyodor Sorokin ru
 Vladimir Sosin ru
 Nikolai Sosin ru
 Nina Sosnina
 Aleksey Sosnov ru
 Aleksey Sosnovsky ru
 Aleksandr Sotnikov ru
 Vasily Sotnikov ru
 Mikhail Sotnikov ru
 Nikolai Sotnikov ru
 Mikhail Sotnichenko ru
 Mikhail Sokhin ru
 Antonín Sochor
 Alekandr Sotsenko ru
 Makar Sochenko ru
 Karsybay Spataev ru
 Fyodor Spakhov ru
 Aleksandr Spekov ru
 Fyodor Spekov ru
 Moisey Spivak ru
 Aleksandr Spivakov ru
 Pyotr Spikin ru
 Nikolai Spiridenko ru
 Vladimir Spiridonov ru
 Aleksandr Spirin ru
 Andrey Spirin ru
 Vasily Spirin ru
 Ivan Spirin ru
 Nikolai Spirin ru
 Pyotr Spirin ru
 Stepan Spirkov ru
 Ivan Spiryakov ru
 Ivan Spitsin ru
 Spiridon Spitsyn ru
 Ivan Spichak ru
 Grigory Spolnik ru
 Sidor Sribny ru
 Nikolai Starnichuk ru
 Joseph Stalin
 Gemel Stankevich ru
 Stepan Stanchev ru
 Ivan Starzhinsky ru
 Anatoly Starikov ru
 Valentin Starikov ru
 Dmitry Starikov ru
 Mikhail Ivanovich Starikov ru
 Mikhail Semyonovich Starikov ru
 Pyotr Starikov ru
 Aleksandr Starikovsky ru
 Georgy Starkov ru
 Yakov Staroverov ru
 Mikhail Starovoytov ru
 Georgy Starodubtsev ru
 Ivan Starokon ru
 Vasily Starostin ru
 Dmitry Starostin ru
 Nikolai Starostin ru
 Aleksandr Startsev ru
 Fyodor Startsev ru
 Artemy Starchenko ru
 Ivan Starchenkov ru
 Nikolai Starchikov ru
 Nikolai Starshinov ru
 Aleksandr Starygin ru
 Aleksey Starykh ru
 Ivan Starykh ru
 Vasily Stasyuk ru
 Nikita Stasyuk ru
 Aleksey Stakhorsky ru
 Vasily Statsenko ru
 Yakov Statsenko ru
 Nikolai Statsyuk ru
 Nikolai Stashek ru
 Nikolai Stashkov ru
 Andrey Steba ru
 Fyodor Stebenyov ru
 Aleksandr Steblyov ru
 Aleksey Steblevsky ru
 Sergey Steblinsky ru
 Yevgeny Stelmakh ru
 Pyotr Stemasov ru
 Yelena Stempkovskaya
 Vladimir Stenin ru
 Afonasy Stennikov ru
 Vasily Stepanenko ru
 Grigory Stepanenko ru
 Ivan Stepanenko (twice)
 Pavel Stepanenko ru
 Pyotr Stepanenko ru
 Mikhail Stepanishchev (twice)
 Fyodor Stepannikov ru
 Aleksandr Alekseevich Stepanov ru
 Aleksandr Mikhailovich Stepanov ru
 Aleksandr Nikolaevich Stepanov ru
 Aleksey Stepanov ru
 Arseny Stepanov ru
 Grigory Stepanov ru
 Dmitry Stepanov ru
 Yevgeny Stepanov ru
 Ivan Vasilyevich Stepanov ru
 Ivan Georgievich Stepanov ru
 Ivan Fyodorovich Stepanov ru
 Konstantin Stepanov ru
 Mikhail Iudovich Stepanov ru
 Mikhail Karpovich Stepanov ru
 Nikita Stepanov ru
 Nikolai Nikitovich Stepanov ru
 Nikolai Petrovich Stepanov ru
 Nikolai Savvich Stepanov ru
 Oleg Stepanov ru
 Fyodor Stepanov ru
 Viktor Stepanenchenko ru
 Grigory Stepanyuk ru
 Nelson Stepanyan (twice)
 Ivan Stepashov ru
 Vasily Styopin ru
 Viktor Styopin ru
 Kuzma Stepin ru
 Arsenty Stepovoy ru
 Nikolai Stepovoy ru
 Semyon Stepuk ru
 Yakov Stepchenko ru
 Aleksey Sterelyukhin ru
 Yefim Sterin ru
 Vasily Sterligov ru
 Dmitry Stefanov ru
 Pyotr Stefanovsky
 Nikolai Stefanchikov ru
 Aleksandr Stovba ru
 Nikolai Stogov ru
 Filipp Stolbov ru
 Nikolai Stolnikov ru
 Aleksandr Stolyarov ru
 Lev Stolyarov ru
 Nikolai Georgievich Stolyarov (twice)
 Nikolai Ivanovich Stolyarov ru
 Flor Stolyarchuk ru
 Aleksey Storozhakov ru
 Feodosy Stotsky ru
 Ilya Strateychuk ru
 Natan Stratievsky ru
 Pyotr Stratiychuk ru
 Gennady Strekalov (twice)
 Pyotr Strekalov ru
 Dmitry Strelets ru
 Fyodor Strelets ru
 Filipp Strelets ru
 Pyotr Streletsky ru
 Vladimir Strelkov ru
 Nikolai Strelkov ru
 Spiridon Strelkov ru
 Vasily Strelnikov ru
 Yefim Strelnikov ru
 Ivan Strelnikov ru
 Vasily Andreevich Strektsov ru
 Vasily Dmitrievich Strektsov ru
 Viktor Nikolaevich Strektsov ru
 Viktor Sergeevich Strektsov ru
 Vladimir Streltsov ru
 Pavel Streltsov ru
 Vladimir Strelchenko ru
 Prokofy Strenakov ru
 Fyodor Strenin ru
 Grigory Strepetov ru
 Konstantin Striganov ru
 Vasily Strigunov ru
 Vladimir Strizhak ru
 Pavel Strizhak ru
 Aleksey Strizhachenko ru
 Yakov Strizhenko ru
 Matevy Strizhkov ru
 Nikolai Strobykub-Yukhvit ru
 Dmitry Stroganov ru
 Nikolai Stroikov ru
 Vasily Strokov ru
 Leonid Stromkin ru
 Kirill Stronsky ru
 Ivan Strochko ru
 Ivan Struzhkin ru
 Ivan Strukov ru
 Vasily Struchkov ru
 Vasily Strygin ru
 Andrey Stryukov ru
 Yakov Studennikov 
 Vasily Stukalov ru
 Grigory Stupak ru
 Ivan Stupin ru
 Mikhail Stupishin ru
 Mikhail Styazhkin ru
 Nikolai Subbota ru
 Valentin Subbotin ru
 Vladimir Subbotin ru
 Yefim Subbotin ru
 Ivan Subbotin ru
 Nikolai Subbotin ru
 Pavel Subbotin ru
 Serafim Subbotin
 Yuri Subbotin ru
 Viktor Suvirov ru
 Aleksandr Ivanovich Suvorov (politruk) ru
 Aleksandr Ivanovich Suvorov (lieutenant) ru
 Aleksandr Yakovlevich Suvorov ru
 Vasily Suvorov ru
 Pyotr Suvorov ru
 Rodion Suvorov ru
 Sergey Nikolaevich Suvorov ru
 Sergey Romanovich Suvorov ru
 Stepan Suvorov ru
 Sergey Sugak ru
 Boris Sugerov ru
 Aleksandr Suginyaev ru
 Vladimir Sugrin ru
 Vladimir Sudakov ru
 Mikhail Sudakov ru
 Arkady Sudarev ru
 Sergey Sudeysky ru
 Vladimir Sudets
 Nikolai Sudilovsky ru
 Imants Sudmalis
 Mikhail Sudnishnikov ru
 Andrey Sudorgin ru
 Viktor Suzdalsky ru
 Nikolai Sukach ru
 Trofim Sukov ru
 Nikolai Sukovatov ru
 Aleksandr Sulaberidze ru
 Viktor Sulyov ru
 Idris Suleymanov
 Rizvan Suleymanov ru
 Sharif Suleymanov ru
 Yakov Suleymanov ru
 Joldas Suleymanov ru
 Andrey Sulima ru
 Pavel Sulimov ru
 Semyon Sulin ru
 Amet-khan Sultan (twice)
 Bary Sultanov ru
 Zakir Sultanov ru
 Isa Sultanov ru
 Yakov Suldin ru
 Andrey Sumin ru
 Zhavdat Sunagatillin ru
 Ivan Sundiev ru
 Dmitry Suponin ru
 Vasily Suprun ru
 Stepan Suprun (twice)
 Ivan Suptel ru
 Kudaybergen Suraganov ru
 Grigory Suramelashvili ru
 Aleksey Surikov ru
 Emil Surikov ru
 Martyn Surin ru
 Vasily Sukov ru
 Grigory Sukov ru
 Pyotr Surkov ru
 Fyodor Surkov ru
 Mikhail Surmach ru
 Nikolai Surnev ru
 Georgy Surnin ru
 Aleksandr Surov ru
 Boris Surovtsev ru
 Pyotr Surovtsev ru
 Mikhail Suroshnikov ru
 Aleksandr Suslov ru
 Aleksey Nikolaevich Suslov ru
 Aleksey Petrovich Suslov ru
 Vasily Suslov ru
 Pyotr Suslov ru
 Yakov Susko ru
 Georgy Sutormin ru
 Grigory Sutulov ru
 Aleksandr Sutyrin ru
 Nikolai Sutyagin
 Sufy Sufyanov ru
 Agadil Sukhambaev ru
 Viktor Sukhanov ru
 Vitaly Sukhanov ru
 Mikhail Sukhanov ru
 Nikolai Sukhanov ru
 Aleksandr Sukharev ru
 Aleksey Sukharev ru
 Yevstafy Sukharev ru
 Ivan Sukharev ru
 Sergey Sukharev ru
 Dmitry Sukharnikov ru
 Tikhov Sukhatsky ru
 Vladimir Sukhachyov ru
 Aleksandr Sukhin ru
 Semyon Sukhin ru
 Nikolai Sukhikh ru
 Nikolai Sukhobsky ru
 Vasily Arsentevich Sukhov ru
 Vasily Ivanovich Sukhov ru
 Vasily Semyonovich Sukhov ru
 Ivan Prokofevich Sukhov ru
 Ivan Stepanovich Sukhov ru
 Konstantin Sukhov ru
 Nikolai Sukhov ru
 Yuri Sukhov ru
 Dmitry Sukhovarov
 Ivan Mikhailovich Sukhomlin ru
 Ivan Moiseevich Sukhomlin ru
 Dmitry Sukhonenko ru
 Aleksey Sukhorukov ru
 Andrey Sukhorukov ru
 Ivan Aleksandrovich Sukhorukov ru
 Ivan Fyodorovich Sukhorukov ru
 Ivan Sukhoruchkin ru
 Pyotr Sukhoruchkin ru
 Aleksandr Suchkov ru
 Nikolai Sushanov ru
 Fyofor Sushkov ru
 Filipp Sushkov ru
 Stepan Sushchev ru
 Kudrat Suyanov ru
 Grigory Skhulukhiya ru
 Vladimir Schastnov ru
 Mikhail Sydko ru
 Pyotr Sykalo ru
 Ivan Sypalo ru
 Ivan Srykin ru
 Pyotr Syroezhkin ru
 Boris Syromyatnikov ru
 Nikolai Syromyatnikov ru
 Sergey Syromyatnikov ru
 Mullayar Syrtlanov ru
 Maguba Syrtlanova
 Dmitry Syrtsov ru
 Vasily Sysoev ru
 Mikhail Sysoev ru
 Pyotr Sysoev ru
 Yuri Sysoev ru
 Mikhail Sysoletin ru
 Vasily Sysolyatin ru
 Ivan Sysolyatin ru
 Vladimir Sytnik ru
 Ivan Sytov
 Andrey Sytko ru
 Vladimir Sych ru
 Aleksandr Sychyov ru
 Vasily Sychyov ru
 Ivan Sychyov ru
 Pyotr Sychenko ru
 Terenty Sychkov ru
 Nikolai Sushchikov ru
 Ilya Syanov ru
 Pyotr Syutkin ru
 Nikolai Syabro ru

References 

 
 Russian Ministry of Defence Database «Подвиг Народа в Великой Отечественной войне 1941—1945 гг.» [Feat of the People in the Great Patriotic War 1941-1945] (in Russian).

Lists of Heroes of the Soviet Union